Johnny Mercer was known principally as a lyricist, but he also wrote music, even composing music for other lyricists. He had number one hits singing his own and other people's songs.

Mercer, Johnny